Darg ( Dargh) is a village in Sughd Region, northern Tajikistan. It is part of the jamoat Shamtuch in the Ayni District.

References

Populated places in Sughd Region